Kĩsêdjê (Suyá, Kĩsêdjê: Khĩsêtjê kapẽrẽ ) is a Northern Jê language (Jê, Macro-Jê) spoken in Mato Grosso, Brazil. It is closely related to Tapayúna; together, they form the Tapajós branch of Northern Jê.

Kĩsêdjê is closely related to Tapayúna; the common past on the Tapajós River, shared by the Kĩsêdjê and the Tapayúna, is still part of their oral history. Phonological differences between the languages include the reflexes of Proto-Northern Jê *m/*mb, *mr/*mbr, *c (in onsets), *ñ (in codas), and *b (in stressed syllables). In Kĩsêdjê, these consonants are reflected as m/mb, mr/mbr, s, n, and p, respectively, whereas Tapayúna has w ([w̃]), nr ([ɾ̃]), t ([t̪]), j ([j]), and w ([w]) in the same words.

Phonology

Consonants
Kĩsêdjê preserved the consonants of Proto-Tapajós almost intact, with the exception of the sound change *t̪ʰ > s.

Onsets
The following table lists some of the possible onsets of Kĩsêdjê; in addition, most of these can further combine with /w/ or /ɲ/ (in words whose Proto-Northern Jê etyma contain one of *wa, *wə̂, or *jê, which are analyzed as complex nuclei). Underlying nasals acquire an oral phase preceding an oral nucleus.

Vowels
The vowel inventory of Kĩsêdjê is shown below (the orthographic representation is given in italics; the characters in slashes stand for the IPA values of each vowel). Nonato (2014) reports that there is no allophonic variation. By convention, the tilde, which is part of the graphemes that denote nasal vowels, is left out in the orthography following <m>, <n>, and <nh> (but not <ng>), as in <mo> [mɔ̃] ‘to go (plural)’. In addition, the vowels /ɘ̃/ and /ã/ are not differentiated in the orthography (both are written as <ã>).

Echo vowels
Kĩsêdjê has a phenomenon whereby an echo vowel is obligatorily inserted in utterance-final words whose underlying form ends in a consonant; that way, all utterances end in vowels on surface in Kĩsêdjê. Vowel epenthesis often causes the underlying coda to lenite. The resulting alternations are represented orthographically, as in thep [ˈt̠ʰɛp̚] / thewe [ˈt̠ʰɛwɛ] ‘fish’, wit [ˈwit̚] / wiri [ˈwiɾi] ‘only’, ngrôt [ˈŋgɹot̚] / ngrôrô [ˈŋgɹoɾo] ‘the Pleiades’, khẽn [ˈkʰɛ̃n̚] / khẽne [ˈkʰɛ̃nɛ̃] ‘stone’, hwysysôm [hʷɨsɨˈsom̚] / hwysysômy [hʷɨsɨˈsomɨ] ‘mosquito’. In words that end in an underlying rhotic coda, echo vowels are inserted regardless of whether the word is in the utterance-final position, as in ngõrõ [ˈŋɔ̃ɽɔ̃] ‘to sleep’ (forms such as *[ˈŋɔ̃ɽ] are unattested).

Morphology

Finiteness
As in all other Northern Jê languages, verbs inflect for finiteness and thus have a basic opposition between a finite form (also form B and main form) and a nonfinite form (also form A and embedded form). Finite forms are used in matrix clauses only, whereas nonfinite forms are used in all types of subordinate clauses as well as in some matrix clauses. Nonfinite forms are most often formed via suffixation and/or prefix substitution. Some verbs (including all descriptives with the exception of katho ‘to leave’, whose nonfinite form is kathoro) lack an overt finiteness distinction.

The available nonfinite suffixes are /-ɽ/ (the most common option, found in many transitive and intransitive verbs, with its allomorph /-j/ after the vowel /a/), /-n/ (found in some transitive verbs), as well as /-k/, /-m/, and /-t/ (found in a handful of intransitive verbs which take a nominative subject when finite), as shown in the table below.

In Proto-Northern Jê, several verbs derived their finite forms by means of leniting the stem-final consonant (*-t, *-c, *-k → *-r, *-j, *-r). In Kĩsêdjê, at least three verbs retain this pattern, though the relation between the finite and nonfinite forms has been obfuscated by a series of regular sound changes, including *-ôj > -wâj (-âj after a labial), *-c > -t.

The erstwhile palatalizing prefix
In Proto-Northern Jê, a small set of verbs formed their nonfinite forms by employing one of the aforementioned processes and a morphophonological process whereby the onset of the stressed syllable became palatal, and the nucleus of the stressed syllable was raised (if possible); this has been attributed to the influence of an underlying palatalizing nonfinite prefix. In Kĩsêdjê, some of these verbs still follow the archaic pattern, though the relation between the finite and nonfinite forms has been obfuscated by a series of regular sound changes.

Prefix substitution or loss
In addition to the aforementioned processes, the finiteness inflection may involve prefix substitution or loss. For example, the valency-reducing prefixes are a(j)- (anticausative) and a- (antipassive) in finite verb forms, but wi- and tá-/tu-, respectively, in the nonfinite forms. In addition, some verbs which denote physiological activities or movement have a prefix (i- and a-, respectively) in their finite forms but not in the nonfinite form. Some examples are given below.

Syntax

Nominative–absolutive clauses
Future, progressive, continuous, completive, and negated clauses in Kĩsêdjê show a cross-linguistically rare morphosyntactic alignment pattern, known as the nominative–absolutive alignment.

Kĩsêdjê has also been considered unusual in the literature because of its unexpected (from a cross-linguistic point of view) distribution of ergative and nominative marking of transitive agents in certain types of clauses, such as future and negative clauses. More specifically, transitive agents expressed by a full noun phrase are nominative (marked by the subject marker ra in the examples below), whereas pronominal transitive agents are ergative, as in the following examples:

Such split has been previously considered to be impossible by R. M. W. Dixon:

Cross-referencing systems are thus basically pronominal (with the affixes having developed from free-form pronouns, in some earlier stage of the language). We would expect them to be on a nominative-accusative pattern, since this characterizes pronouns at the extreme left of the hierarchy … What we can predict is that, if there is a ‘split’ of this kind, then bound prefixes will be accusative and case-marking on free forms will be ergative. This is exactly what is found.

References

Jê languages
Languages of Xingu Indigenous Park